The 1999 Thalgo Australian Women's Hardcourts was a women's tennis tournament played on outdoor hard courts at the Hope Island Resort Tennis Centre in Hope Island, Queensland in Australia that was part of the Tier III category of the 1999 WTA Tour. It was the third edition of the tournament and was held from 3 January through 9 January 1999. Second-seeded Patty Schnyder won the singles title and earned $27,000 first-prize money.

Finals

Singles

 Patty Schnyder defeated  Mary Pierce, 4–6, 7–6(7–5), 6–2
 It was Schnyder's 1st title of the year and the 8th of her career.

Doubles

 Corina Morariu /  Larisa Neiland defeated  Kristine Kunce /  Irina Spîrlea, 6–3, 6–3

Entrants

Seeds

Other entrants
The following players received wildcards into the singles main draw:
  Nicole Pratt
  Alicia Molik

The following players received wildcards into the doubles main draw:
  Annabel Ellwood /  Alicia Molik

The following players received entry from the singles qualifying draw:

  Inés Gorrochategui
  Rachel McQuillan
  Annabel Ellwood
  Laurence Courtois

The following players received the lucky loser spots:

  Brie Rippner

The following players received entry from the doubles qualifying draw:

  Evie Dominikovic /  Cindy Watson

External links
 ITF tournament edition details
 Tournament draws

 
Thalgo Australian Women's Hardcourts
Brisbane International
Thal
January 1999 sports events in Australia